Dino Piero Giarda (born 9 December 1936) is an Italian economist and academia. He served as Minister without portfolio for Parliamentary Relations  and Implementation of the Government Program in the Monti Cabinet.

Early life
Giarda was born in Milan in 1936.

Career
Giarda was a professor of public finance at Università Cattolica del Sacro Cuore.

References

Living people
Italian economists
Government ministers of Italy
1936 births